The 1942 Creighton Bluejays football team was an American football team that represented Creighton University as a member of the Missouri Valley Conference (MVC) during the 1942 college football season. In its second season under head coach Maurice H. Palrang, and its final season of intercollegiate football, Creighton compiled a 5–4 record (1–4 against MVC opponents) and outscored opponents by a total of 170 to 127. The team played its home games at Creighton Stadium in Omaha, Nebraska.

In the final game in program history, Creighton was tied with undefeated Tulsa (ranked No. 6 in the AP Poll) at the end of the third quarter, but lost by a 33–19 score as Tulsa rallied for two touchdowns in the fourth quarter.

A subsequent game scheduled for November 29 against Loyola in Los Angeles was cancelled due to wartime travel restrictions.

In December 1942, Creighton's athletic director, Rev. David A. Shyne, announced that, at the end of the basketball season, the school would suspend its participation in intercollegiate football and basketball for the duration of the war.  The football program did not return after the war.

Schedule

References

Creighton
Creighton Bluejays football seasons
Creighton Bluejays football